Joseph Bharat Cornell is a  nature educator in the United States. He was given the Indian name Bharat by his yoga teacher Swāmī Kriyānanda Giri. He wrote the book Sharing Nature with Children in the early 1970s to promote outdoor learning.  His book had a large influence on education in the United States, and was translated into 15 languages with sales of half a million worldwide.

Cornell founded the "Sharing Nature Foundation" in 1979 to help his work in promoting nature education.  He is still enthusiastic and involved in his work by holding activities and designing nature games for children.

List of publications
 The Sharing Nature With Children Book series
 "Sharing Nature With Children: the classic parents' and teachers' nature awareness guidebook", (1984 2nd ed. in 1998), Dawn Publications, CA: USA. 
 "Sharing the Joy of Nature: Nature Activities for All Ages", (1989, 2nd ed in 1998), Dawn Publications, Nevada City, CA: USA. 
 "Sharing Nature With Children II", (1998), (A revised and updated edition of "Sharing the Joy of Nature."),Dawn Publications, Nevada City, CA: USA. 
 "John Muir: My Life With Nature", (2000), Dawn Publications, CA: USA.  (Hardcover) /  (Paperback)
 Sharing Nature Pocket Guide
 "With Beauty Before Me: An Inspirational Guide for Nature Walks", (2000), Dawn Publications, CA: USA. 
 "Listening to Nature: How to Deepen Your Awareness of Nature", (1987), Dawn Publications, Nevada City, CA: USA. 
 "Journey to the Heart of Nature: A Guided Exploration", (1995), Dawn Publications, Nevada City, CA: USA. 
 "Ocean Animals Clue Game", (1995), Dawn Publications, Nevada City, CA: USA. 
 "Rainforest Animals Clue Game", (1995), Dawn Publications, Nevada City, CA: USA. 
 "Listening to Nature: How to Deepen Your Awareness of Nature", (2014; a thorough revision), Crystal Clarity Publishers, Nevada City, CA: USA. 
 "The Sky and Earth Touched Me: Sharing Nature® Wellness Exercises", (2014), Crystal Clarity Publishers, Nevada City, CA: USA. 
 "Sharing Nature: Nature Awareness Activities for All Ages", (2015), Crystal Clarity Publishers, Nevada City, CA: USA.

References

External links
 Personal Website

American educators
American non-fiction environmental writers
Living people
Year of birth missing (living people)